Olga Vedyacheva (also spelled Vediasheva,  Kuradchenko, born 5 November 1970) is a Kazakhstani alpine skier. She competed in three events at the 1994 Winter Olympics.

References

External links
 
 
 

1970 births
Living people
Kazakhstani female alpine skiers
Olympic alpine skiers of Kazakhstan
Alpine skiers at the 1994 Winter Olympics
Place of birth missing (living people)
Asian Games medalists in alpine skiing
Asian Games gold medalists for Kazakhstan
Asian Games silver medalists for Kazakhstan
Asian Games bronze medalists for Kazakhstan
Alpine skiers at the 1996 Asian Winter Games
Alpine skiers at the 1999 Asian Winter Games
Medalists at the 1996 Asian Winter Games
Medalists at the 1999 Asian Winter Games